Arao Station (荒尾駅) is the name of two train stations in Japan:

 Arao Station (Gifu)
 Arao Station (Kumamoto)